Dreatin Glacier is the 12 km long and 7.5 km wide glacier on the northeast side of Detroit Plateau on Trinity Peninsula in Graham Land, Antarctica.  It lies southwest of Znepole Ice Piedmont and north of Aitkenhead Glacier, draining the area southwest of Mount Bradley and north of Tufft Nunatak, and flowing southeastwards into Prince Gustav Channel, Weddell Sea west of Marmais Point.

The glacier is named after the settlement of Dreatin in Western Bulgaria.

Location
German-British mapping in 1996.

See also
 List of glaciers in the Antarctic
 Glaciology

Maps
 Trinity Peninsula. Scale 1:250000 topographic map No. 5697. Institut für Angewandte Geodäsie and British Antarctic Survey, 1996.
 Antarctic Digital Database (ADD). Scale 1:250000 topographic map of Antarctica. Scientific Committee on Antarctic Research (SCAR). Since 1993, regularly updated.

References
 Dreatin Glacier SCAR Composite Antarctic Gazetteer
 Bulgarian Antarctic Gazetteer. Antarctic Place-names Commission. (details in Bulgarian, basic data in English)

External links
 Dreatin Glacier. Adjusted Copernix satellite image

Glaciers of Trinity Peninsula
Bulgaria and the Antarctic